Denim is a kind of cloth. It may also refer to:

 Denim (band), Lawrence Hayward's musical group
 Denim Air, a Dutch charter airline